Radim Hruška (born October 12, 1984) is a Czech professional ice hockey player who currently plays with HC Nové Zámky in the Tipsport Liga.

Hruška previously played for HC Vsetín, HC Slezan Opava, HC Olomouc, HC Havířov, HK 36 Skalica and HC Vítkovice.

References

External links

1984 births
Living people
Czech ice hockey defencemen
HC Havířov players
HC Karlovy Vary players
HC Kometa Brno players
HC Košice players
BK Mladá Boleslav players
HC Nové Zámky players
HC Olomouc players
People from Vsetín
HK 36 Skalica players
HC Slezan Opava players
HC Vítkovice players
VHK Vsetín players
MsHK Žilina players
Sportspeople from the Zlín Region
Czech expatriate ice hockey players in Slovakia